Prorhinotermes is a genus of termites belonging to the family Rhinotermitidae.

The species of this genus are found in Malesia and Australia.

Species:

Prorhinotermes canalifrons 
Prorhinotermes flavus 
Prorhinotermes hainanensis 
Prorhinotermes inopinatus 
Prorhinotermes molinoi 
Prorhinotermes oceanicus 
Prorhinotermes ponapensis 
Prorhinotermes rugifer 
Prorhinotermes simplex 
Prorhinotermes spectabilis 
Prorhinotermes xishaensis

References

Rhinotermitidae
Termite genera